Marvel Omnibus is a line of large format, high quality, full color, hardcover graphic novel omnibuses published by Marvel Comics. The Marvel Omnibus series reprints comics previously printed in single-issue format. Unlike Marvel's Essential line, these collections are printed on higher-quality paper stock and provide full-color compilations of multiple comics. They often contain complete runs, either by collecting multiple consecutive issues or by focusing on the works of a particular writer or artist. Many of them also reprint the letters pages as found in the original comics.

Collections

See also
 List of comic books on CD/DVD
 Marvel Masterworks
 Marvel Ultimate Collection, Complete Epic and Epic Collection lines
 Marvel Oversized Hardcovers

Notes

References

Marvel Comics lines
Comic book collection books